Kerching! was a children's comedy drama which aired on the CBBC Channel between 6 January 2003 and 24 February 2006. The show follows the life of teenage dot-com entrepreneur Taj Lewis, along with his two friends, Seymour Franklin and Danny Spooner.

Cast

Episodes

Series 1 (2003)

Series 2 (2004)

Series 3 (2005)

Series 4 (2006)

References

External links

 

BBC children's television shows
BBC television sitcoms
Black British sitcoms
Business-related television series in the United Kingdom
2000s British children's television series
2003 British television series debuts
2006 British television series endings
BBC high definition shows
2000s British teen sitcoms
English-language television shows
Television series about teenagers